James Scott (born 1881) was a Scottish professional footballer who played as a goalkeeper.

Career
Scott moved from St Mirren to Bradford City in November 1905. He made 2 league appearances for the club, before being released in 1906.

Sources

References

1881 births
Date of death missing
Scottish footballers
St Mirren F.C. players
Bradford City A.F.C. players
English Football League players
Association football goalkeepers